The Awakening is an album led by saxophonist Billy Harper recorded in 1979 in Paris and released on the French Marge label.

Reception 

In his review for AllMusic, Thom Jurek states "This 1979 date by tenor saxophonist Billy Harper is one of his most transcendent. Rife with his deep study of Coltrane's modalism, and his own deep knowledge of the blues and Eastern music, Harper and his quintet take on three extended pieces... This is a winner, top to bottom, and one of the more engaging vanguard jazz outings of the late '70s to come from American soil".

Track listing 
All compositions by Billy Harper
 "The Awakening" - 8:00
 "Soran Bushi-B.H." - 12:44
 "Cry of Hunger" - 20:14

Personnel 
Billy Harper - tenor saxophone
Everett Hollins - trumpet
Fred Hersch - piano
Louie "Mbiki" Spears - bass
Horacee Arnold - drums

Source:

References 

1979 albums
Billy Harper albums
Marge Records albums